Savannah Ré Simpson, who performs as Savannah Ré, is a Canadian rhythm and blues singer from Scarborough, Ontario, whose debut EP Opia was released in 2020.

A graduate of St. John Paul II Catholic Secondary School in Scarborough, Ré began performing in Toronto after being pushed to get onstage by the organizer of an open mic show at the city's Lambadina lounge. She subsequently drew the attention of musician and producer Babyface, who invited her to participate in two emerging artist competitions, and Jessie Reyez, for whom she performed as an opening act for several dates on the tour to support Being Human in Public, before signing to Boi-1da's 1Music label.

At the Juno Awards of 2021, Ré won the Traditional R&B/Soul Recording of the Year for her song "Solid", and was nominated for Contemporary R&B/Soul Recording of the Year for her song "Where You Are. Opia was subsequently longlisted for the 2021 Polaris Music Prize. Her video for "Solid", directed by Alicia K. Harris, was a nominee for the 2021 Prism Prize.

"Solid" was a nominee for the 2021 SOCAN Songwriting Prize.

Ré performed "O Canada" at the 108th Grey Cup.

References

Living people
Canadian rhythm and blues singers
Canadian soul singers
21st-century Black Canadian women singers
Musicians from Toronto
People from Scarborough, Toronto
Year of birth missing (living people)
Juno Award winners